Feydeau may refer to:

People
Ernest-Aimé Feydeau (1821–1873), French writer
Georges Feydeau (1862–1921), playwright, son of Ernest-Aimé
Jean-Pierre Feydeau (1903–1970), French film director and screenwriter

Other uses
Théâtre Feydeau, a theatre completed in 1791 in Paris, France, and its company of performers

Surnames of French origin